Mardy Fish and Andy Roddick were the defending champions, but they chose not to play together.
Fish partnered up with Mario Ančić, but they lost to Feliciano López and Fernando Verdasco in the first round.
Roddick partnered up with James Blake, but they lost to Daniel Nestor and Nenad Zimonjić in the second round.

Marc López and Rafael Nadal defeated 7–6(10–8), 6–3 first-seeded pair Nestor and Zimonjić in the final.

Seeds

Draw

Finals

Top half

Bottom half

External links
Main Draw Doubles

2010 ATP World Tour
2010 BNP Paribas Open